The Samaritan Health Services (SHS) is a non-profit, integrated delivery healthcare system consisting of five hospitals in Oregon and is headquartered in Corvallis, Oregon.

Operations
SHS operates five hospitals and has over five hundred employed providers in Oregon. The largest hospitals are two Acute Care Hospitals in Corvallis and Albany, and three Critical Access Hospitals(CAHs) in Lebanon, Newport, and Lincoln City.

Hospitals
SHS oversees the operations of five Oregon hospitals:
Good Samaritan Regional Medical Center is a 188-bed medical facility  in Corvallis, Oregon. The only hospital in the city, it is a level II trauma center, and serves the Linn, Benton, and Lincoln County area.
Samaritan Albany General Hospital is a 76-bed medical facility in Albany, Oregon. Services include a level III trauma center, as well as the first open magnetic resonance imaging facility in the middle Willamette Valley.
Samaritan Lebanon Community Hospital is a 25-bed critical access care facility in Lebanon, Oregon. It provides services to eastern Linn County.
Samaritan North Lincoln Hospital is a 25-bed critical access hospital and Level IV trauma center. It is located in the coastal town of Lincoln City, Oregon. This hospital serves the residents and visitors of Lincoln County.
Samaritan Pacific Communities Hospital is a 25-bed acute care medical facility  in Newport, Oregon. Services include a level IV trauma center.

Samaritan Albany General Hospital

Samaritan Albany General Hospital is a 76-bed medical facility in Albany, Oregon. Services include a level III trauma center, as well as the first open magnetic resonance imaging facility in the middle Willamette Valley.

It is accredited by the Joint Commission on Accreditation of Health Care Organizations (JCAHO).

Samaritan Lebanon Community Hospital

Samaritan Lebanon Community Hospital is a 25-bed critical access care facility at 525 N. Santiam Hwy, Lebanon, Oregon, United States.  It provides services to eastern Linn County.

This facility is accredited by the Det Norske Veritas (DNV).

Samaritan Pacific Communities Hospital

Samaritan Pacific Communities Hospital is a 25-bed acute care medical facility at 930 SW Abbey Newport, Oregon, United States. Services include a level IV trauma center.

The hospital was built in 1952 as a 17-bed acute care facility. Since then, it has been remodeled and expanded to meet the growing needs of the community. Currently, the hospital is a 25-bed critical access hospital, with 380 employees, 110 of whom are nurses, and 120 volunteers.

It is accredited by the Joint Commission on Accreditation of Health Care Organizations (JCAHO).

Heliport
The Pacific Communities Hospital Heliport is located at the hospital.

Governance
In 2018, Doug Boysen, former vice president and General Counsel, was appointed as CEO of the health system. Bob Turngren MD was hired a few months later as Chief Medical Officer.

InterCommunity Health Network
SHS is partnered with the InterCommunity Health Network (IHN) Coordinated Care Organization (CCO). IHN was formed in 2012 by local public, private, and non-profit partners to unify health services and systems for Oregon Health Plan (Medicaid) members in Benton, Lincoln, and Linn Counties and covers almost fifty five thousand individuals.

Awards
In 2017 SHS was listed as one of three finalists for the 2017 American Hospital Association Foster G. McGaw Prize for Excellence in Community Service, a national award that recognizes hospitals and hospital systems for improving the healthcare of their patients and communities.

In 2018, the Portland Business Journal listed SHS as the Healthiest Employer of Oregon, 5000 or More Employees, ranked by Healthiest Employers Index Score. This was the sixth time it received recognition in one of the categories for Healthiest Employer. The award was created to recognize organizations that are committed to creating a healthy workplace.

See also
List of hospitals in Oregon
Lebanon Hospital Heliport
College of Osteopathic Medicine of the Pacific, Northwest

References

External links
 
 Samaritan Albany General Hospital
 Lebanon Community Hospital
 Samaritan Pacific Communities Hospital

 
Hospital networks in the United States
Healthcare in Oregon
Health insurance in the United States
Non-profit organizations based in Oregon
Privately held companies of the United States
Companies based in Corvallis, Oregon